Edwin Howard Baker Pratt (June 5, 1913 – March 18, 1975), was an American educator and headmaster of Buckingham Browne & Nichols.

Early life
On June 5, 1913, Pratt was born in Glen Cove, New York. Pratt's father was John Teele Pratt, a lawyer and financier. Pratt's mother Ruth Baker Pratt, a Republican Congresswoman. Pratt's grandfather was Charles Pratt, an oil industry pioneer.  Pratt had four siblings and was named after his maternal uncle, Edwin Howard Baker, the head of Organo Chemical Company of Cambridge.

In 1936, Pratt graduated from Harvard College.

Career
From 1949 to 1968, Pratt served as the headmaster of the private Browne & Nichols, now Buckingham Browne & Nichols, in Cambridge, Massachusetts. He was previously a teacher at the Westminster School.

Personal life
In 1935, Pratt became engaged to Aileen Kelly of Massachusetts, who had been born in Monte Carlo in 1915. They married in 1936 at St. Stephen's Episcopal Church in Pittsfield, and together had four children, the youngest of whom is singer-songwriter Andy Pratt.

Pratt, a resident of Marion, Massachusetts, died on March 18, 1975, at Peter Bent Brigham Hospital in Boston, Massachusetts, aged 61. His widow died the following year in 1976.

Legacy
Through bequests to Buckingham Browne & Nichols, there are the Edwin H. B. Pratt Faculty Fund and the Edwin and Aileen Pratt Faculty Development Fund.

References

External links
 Edwin Pratt's 1931 passport from www.passportland.com

1913 births
1975 deaths
Harvard College alumni
People from Boston
20th-century American educators
People from Glen Cove, New York
Charles Pratt family
Educators from New York (state)